Metasphenisca negeviana is a species of tephritid or fruit flies in the genus Metasphenisca of the family Tephritidae.

Distribution
Israel, Egypt, Saudi Arabia.

References

Tephritinae
Insects described in 1974
Diptera of Africa
Diptera of Asia